Theodore D. "Ted" Saar Jr. (April 25, 1918 – October 22, 1981) was an American politician who served as a Democrat in the Kansas State Senate from 1963 to 1976.

Saar was born in Chanute, Kansas and worked as a railroad engineer. He was originally appointed to the Kansas Senate in 1963, to fill the unexpired term of F.O. Doty, who resigned the 9th district seat. He was re-elected in his own right in 1964 (switching districts to the 1st), switched districts again in 1968 to run in the 8th, and finally served for one term in the 13th Senate district.

References

Democratic Party Kansas state senators
20th-century American politicians
People from Pittsburg, Kansas
1918 births
1981 deaths